This is a list of the buildings, sites, districts, and objects listed on the National Register of Historic Places across the United States Minor Outlying Islands. There are currently two listed sites located on two of the twelve islands or atolls that make up the Minor Outlying Islands.

Listings 

|}

See also
List of United States National Historic Landmarks in United States commonwealths and territories, associated states, and foreign states

References

External links 
 

Minor Outlying Islands
United States Minor Outlying Islands